"Three Words, Two Hearts, One Night" is a song co-written and recorded by American country music artist Mark Collie.  It was released in June 1995 as the first single from the album Tennessee Plates.  The song reached #25 on the Billboard Hot Country Singles & Tracks chart.  The song was written by Collie and Gerry House.

Chart performance

References

1995 singles
1995 songs
Mark Collie songs
Songs written by Mark Collie
Songs written by Gerry House
Song recordings produced by James Stroud
Giant Records (Warner) singles